Greatest Hits: Sound of Money is a compilation of American rock singer Eddie Money's biggest hits plus three new tracks: "Peace in Our Time", "Looking Through the Eyes of a Child" and "Stop Steppin' on My Heart". The disc was originally released in 1989 by Columbia Records. A remastered CD surfaced in 2009, released by SPV.

The song "Looking Through the Eyes of a Child" was covered by Puerto Rican singer Chayanne on his album Atado a Tu Amor, as "Soy como un niño" (Spanish for "I'm Like a Child")

Track listing

Singles
 "Peace in Our Time" (1990) #11 US

References 

1989 greatest hits albums
Eddie Money compilation albums
Columbia Records compilation albums